The 2020–21 Slovenian Basketball League, also known as Liga Nova KBM due to sponsorship reasons, was the 30th season of the Premier A Slovenian Basketball League.

Format

Regular season 
In the first phase, ten teams competed in a home-and-away round-robin series (18 games total). Teams advanced from the regular season to one of two postseason stages, depending on their league position.

Second phase 
The top five teams from the regular season advanced to the championship phase. Cedevita Olimpija started their competition from this phase. These teams started the second phase from scratch, with no results carrying over from the regular season. Each team played a total of 10 games in this phase; as in the regular season, a home-and-away round-robin was used.

The last five teams entered a home-and-away round-robin playout-league where two best teams qualify to quarterfinals. Since KK Koper Primorska had been already disqualified, each team played 6 games in this phase instead of 8. The last team was relegated.

Playoffs 
Eight teams joined the playoffs.

Teams
KK Triglav Kranj was promoted. 

Commission of the Basketball Federation of Slovenia hasn't been approved the licence for KK Koper Primorska. On June 30, after club's appeal the licence was granted.

On December 23, Koper Primorska.decided to withdraw from the Liga Nova KBM because of the club's financial instability. All their matches were declared with score 0-20.

Venues and locations

Managerial changes

Regular season

League table

Championship group

League table

Relegation group

League table

Playoffs
Seeded teams played at home games 1, 3 and, in the finals, 5.

Bracket

Awards

Regular Season MVP
 Dino Murić (GGD Šenčur)

Season MVP
 Dino Murić (GGD Šenčur)

Finals MVP
 Kendrick Perry (Cedevita Olimpija)

Statistical leaders

| width=50% valign=top |

Points

|}
|}

| width=50% valign=top |

Assists

|}
|}

Slovenian clubs in European competitions

See also 
 2020–21 KK Cedevita Olimpija season

References

External links
Slovenian Basketball Federation

Slovenian Basketball League seasons
Slovenia
1